Ashchykol is a salt lake in the Sarysu and Talas districts, Jambyl Region, Kazakhstan.

Geography
Ashchykol is located north of the Karatau Range, in the lower Talas river basin. Lake Tuzkol lies very close to the west, and Akkol  to the southeast. The Koktal flows into the lake from the southwest and a branch of it connects it with Tuzkol to the west. A tributary of the Asa river flows out of the lake from the eastern shore.

On the other hand, the eastern lakeshore is flat and sandy, while the southern is clayey. The water freezes at the end of December and melts at the end of March. Depending from the rainfall the lake dries completely in the summer, becoming a vast salt flat.

Flora and fauna
Reeds grow on some of the lakeshore stretches. There are seasons in which geese, ducks and waders stop over in the lake.

See also
List of lakes of Kazakhstan

References

External links
Chu-Talas, Kazakhstan

Lakes of Kazakhstan
Jambyl Region